The 1942–43 İstanbul Football League season was the 35th season of the league. Beşiktaş JK won the league for the 7th time.

Season

References

External links

Istanbul Football League seasons
Turkey
2